The South Jersey Banshees were a W-League soccer club based in a variety of locations around Southern New Jersey. They played six seasons before the club ceased operations after the 2006 season.

Year-by-year

Notable former players

Head coaches
  Wayne Grocott (2001)
  David Jones (2002)
  George Dunbar (2003-06)

Stadia

2001
Cherokee High School; Marlton, New Jersey
Carey Stadium; Ocean City, New Jersey(1 game)

2002
Carey Stadium; Ocean City, New Jersey
Rugers-Camden Community Park; Camden, New Jersey

2003
Rutgers-Camden Community Park; Camden, New Jersey

2004
Winslow Stadium; Winslow, New Jersey
Rugers-Camden Community Park; Camden, New Jersey (1 game)
DePaul Catholic High School; Wayne, New Jersey (1 game)

2005
Winslow Stadium; Winslow, New Jersey

2006
Winslow Stadium; Winslow, New Jersey
Carey Stadium; Ocean City, New Jersey (1 game)

See also
Ocean City Barons
W-League

Winslow Township, New Jersey
Women's soccer clubs in the United States
Soccer clubs in New Jersey
Defunct USL W-League (1995–2015) teams
2003 establishments in New Jersey
2006 disestablishments in New Jersey
Association football clubs established in 2003
Association football clubs disestablished in 2006
Women's sports in New Jersey